Rahul Desraj Chahar (born 4 August 1999) is an Indian cricketer who plays for Rajasthan in domestic cricket and Punjab Kings in the Indian Premier League. He made his international debut for India in August 2019.

Early life and personal life
Rahul was born in Hindu Jat family to Desraj Singh Chahar and Usha Chahar. His paternal uncle, Lokendra Singh Chahar is his cricket coach who trained him and his cousin Deepak Chahar together. Rahul started playing cricket at the age of 8 years after watching his elder cousin brother Deepak Chahar. He started off as a fast bowler but later realised his actual talent was in spinning the ball. His cousin brother, Deepak is also an Indian international cricketer. And his cousin Malti Chahar is a Bollywood actress. Rahul got engaged to his long-time girlfriend Ishani in 2019 & got married in March 2022.

Domestic career
Rahul made his first-class debut for Rajasthan in the 2016–17 Ranji Trophy on 5 November 2016. He made his List A debut for Rajasthan in the 2016–17 Vijay Hazare Trophy on 25 February 2017.

In February 2017, Rahul was bought by the Rising Pune Supergiant team for the 2017 Indian Premier League for 10 lakhs. He made his Twenty20 cricket (T20) debut in the 2017 Indian Premier League on 8 April 2017. In January 2018, he was bought by the Mumbai Indians in the 2018 IPL auction.

Rahul was the leading wicket-taker for Rajasthan in the 2018–19 Vijay Hazare Trophy, with twenty dismissals in nine matches. In October 2018, he was named in India C's squad for the 2018–19 Deodhar Trophy.

In August 2019, Rahul was named in the India Green team's squad for the 2019–20 Duleep Trophy. In February 2022, he was bought by the Punjab Kings in the auction for the 2022 Indian Premier League tournament.

International career
In July 2019, Rahul was named for India's Twenty20 International (T20I) squad for the series against the West Indies. He made his T20I debut against the West Indies on 6 August 2019. In January 2021, he was named as one of five standby players in India's Test squad for their series against England. The following month, he was added to India's squad ahead of the first Test.

In June 2021, Rahul was named in India's One Day International (ODI) squad for their series against Sri Lanka. He made his ODI debut on 23 July 2021, for India against Sri Lanka. In September 2021, Chahar was named in India's squad for the 2021 ICC Men's T20 World Cup.

References

External links
 

1999 births
Living people
Indian cricketers
India One Day International cricketers
India Twenty20 International cricketers
Rajasthan cricketers
Rising Pune Supergiant cricketers
Mumbai Indians cricketers
Punjab Kings cricketers